Richard E. Fletcher (June 1, 1916 – March 16, 1983) was an American artist, best known for his illustration of the "Dick Tracy" comic strip. Fletcher produced the strip with Chester Gould for 16 years, then after Chester Gould's retirement in 1977 Fletcher produced the "Dick Tracy" comic strip an additional 6 years until his death on March 16, 1983.

Early life
Rick Fletcher was born and raised in Burlington, Iowa, the son of Maude and William Fletcher. In 1934, his family moved to Galesburg, Illinois, and the following year he became an advertising artist at the Tri City Star and later an art director for the Rudy A. Moritz Advertising Agency in Davenport, Iowa.

World War II
In 1942, Fletcher's career was interrupted by World War II. He enlisted at Camp Dodge, Iowa and attended Officer Candidate School in Fort Belvoir, Virginia. A year later, he was commissioned in the Corps of Engineers and assigned as a 1st Lieutenant S-1 Adjutant to the 308th Engineer Combat Battalion Headquarters with the 83rd Infantry Division. Fletcher went through five European military campaigns: from D-Day +12 at Omaha Beach, France, fighting in the hedgerows of Normandy, relieving the 101st Airborne in Carentan France, fighting through France to Belgium, the Netherlands and Germany. He fought in the Battle of the Bulge and the Hurtgen Forest. When General Dwight D. Eisenhower ordered all Armies to halt, Fletcher and the 83rd Infantry Division were less than two hours away from Hitler hiding in his bunker. The Russian Army eventually raided the bunker two weeks later. At the end of the war, Fletcher served as Commanding Officer of the Sonndorf Prisoner of War Camp in Germany, and Contracting Officer to build camps for displaced persons and prisoners of war. Fletcher received the Bronze Star Medal for distinguishing himself by meritorious service in connection with military operations against the enemy of the United States, he refused the purple heart for his slight wounds because he felt his wounds weren't as serious as his fellow soldiers. Fletcher also spent time during the war taking photographs with his 35mm Leica camera to document his journey through Europe. He returned to the United States new years day 1946. His name is inscribed in the Book of Honor at the Court of Patriots in Rock Island, Illinois where he is buried with his wife Beverly in the National Cemetery.

Post-war activities
After the war, Fletcher decided to start his life and career in Chicago, Illinois where he met his sister's roommate and future wife, Beverly Crosbie. After dating for 3 months, the two were married on January 4, 1947. Previously, in 1946, he was offered a job at the Chicago Tribune in the advertising art department. He studied illustration under the wing of Walt Disney's teacher and role model, Carey Orr for several years. In 1953 Fletcher and his colleague, Athena Robbins began producing their own weekly syndicated strip titled, "The Old Glory Story" which ran weekly in the Chicago Tribune and syndicated to hundreds of newspapers around the world until 1966. "The Old Glory Story" was based on the history of the American Flag and won many awards for both the Chicago Tribune and Fletcher/Robbins.

"Dick Tracy"

In 1961, an opportunity arose from another Tribune Tower colleague, Chester Gould, creator of "Dick Tracy". Gould offered Fletcher a position as assistant artist, which was previously held by a young Dick Locher. When Gould retired in 1977, Fletcher took over full art production of the strip. He worked with writer, Max Allan Collins. Fletcher continued to draw "Dick Tracy" until his death on March 16, 1983.

References 

American comics artists
People from Burlington, Iowa
1916 births
1983 deaths
Chicago Tribune people
American comic strip cartoonists
People from Woodstock, Illinois
Dick Tracy